Fida M. Kamal is a Bangladeshi lawyer and former Attorney General of Bangladesh.

Career
Kamal is a former additional attorney general. He was the Attorney General of Bangladesh from January 2007 to July 2008. He resigned over differences with the Military backed Caretaker Government of Bangladesh.

References

Attorneys General of Bangladesh
Living people
20th-century Bangladeshi lawyers
Year of birth missing (living people)
21st-century Bangladeshi lawyers